Pleuroperitoneal is a term denoting the pleural and peritoneal serous membranes or the cavities they line. It is divided from the pericardial cavity by the transverse septum. Congenital defect or traumatic injury of pleuroperitoneal membrane can lead to diaphragmatic hernia.

Membrane biology